Rio Calovebora is a river on the Caribbean coast of Panama.

See also
List of rivers of Panama

References
 Rand McNally, The New International Atlas, 1993.
CIA map, 1995.
GeoNames

Rivers of Panama